Madrassa Shahi (alternatively known as Jamia Qasmia) is an Islamic seminary in Moradabad, Uttar Pradesh. It was established in 1879 by the poor Muslims of Moradabad under the supervision of Islamic scholar, Muhammad Qasim Nanautawi, who also established the Darul Uloom Deoband. This started as Madrasatul Ghuraba, but gained recognition as Madrasa Shahi. Its first principal was Ahmad Hasan Amrohi.

History
Madrasa Shahi was established by the poor Muslims of Moradabad at the suggestion of Muhammad Qasim Nanautawi in 1879. It was thus known as "Madrasatul Ghuraba" (The School of the Poor) and Ahmad Hasan Amrohi was appointed its first principal. He served there for seven years, and scholars such as Abdur Rahman Siddiqi Amrohi, Abdul Ghani Phalaudi, Muhammad Yahya Shahjahanpuri and Khadim Hussain Amrohi graduated in those years. Madrasa Shahi was established on the lines of Darul Uloom Deoband. It did not accept any aid from the government.

Madrasa Shahi was initially patronized by Rashid Ahmad Gangohi. Later, its patrons included Mahmud Hasan Deobandi, Hussain Ahmed Madani, Syed Fakhruddin Ahmad, Syed Muhammad Miyan Deobandi, Muhammad Zakariya Kandhlawi and As'ad Madani. As of 2021, Arshad Madani is the patron of the institution.

Courses offered
Madarassa Shahi offers following courses:
Tajweed and Qiraa't.
Hifz.
Aalimiyat (Aalim course).
Ifta (Mufti course).
Takmeel-e-Adab (Arabic literature).
Takhassus Fil-Adab.
Calligraphy

Publications
Madrasa Shahi publishes its monthly Urdu journal, Nidā-e-Shāhi, since 1990. Tārīkh-e-Shāhi Number, Hajj-o-Ziyārat Number and Naat-un-Nabi Number are its few historical documentary issues.

Alumni

References

Bibliography
 
 

Deobandi Islamic universities and colleges
Islamic education in India
Madrasas in India
Islamic universities and colleges in India
Moradabad